The following is about the qualification rules and allocation of spots for the figure skating events at the 2014 Winter Olympics.

Qualification system
A total of 148 quota spots are available to athletes to compete at the games. A maximum of 18 athletes can be entered by a National Olympic Committee, with a maximum of 9 men or 9 women. An additional six quota spots were made available for the team event. A further ten team trophy quotas (two in each discipline) will be distributed to countries qualifying for the team event, but not the discipline itself. This means up to a maximum of 158 athletes can partake.

Skater qualification
There is no individual athlete qualification to the Olympics; the choice of which athlete(s) to send to the Games is at the discretion of each country's National Olympic Committee. Each country is allowed a maximum of three entries per discipline, resulting in a maximum of 18 athletes (nine men and nine women) possible per country.

Country qualification
The number of entries for the figure skating events at the Olympic Games is limited by a quota set by the International Olympic Committee. A total of 148 quota spots are available to athletes to compete at the games. There will be 30 skaters in the disciplines of men's and ladies' singles, 20 pair skating teams, and 24 ice dance teams. Additionally, ten nations qualified for the team event.

Countries were able to qualify entries to the 2014 Winter Olympics in two ways. Most spots were allocated based on the results of the 2013 World Championships. At the event, countries were able to qualify up to three entries in each discipline according to the usual system in place; countries which earned multiple spots to the Olympics also earned multiple spots to the 2014 World Championships. Every discipline qualified separately.

At the World Championships, the system was as follows:

according to rule 378(2) of the ISU any competitor who qualified for the short program received a maximum placement score of 18, and any competitor who qualified for the long program received a maximum placement score of 16.

Qualification spots available per tournament
The results of the 2013 World Championships determined 83 total spots: 24 entries in each singles discipline, 16 in pairs, and 19 in ice dance. The available spots were awarded going down the results list, with multiple spots being awarded first.

The remainder of the spots were filled at the 2013 Nebelhorn Trophy in late September 2013. Countries which had already earned an entry to the Olympics were not allowed to qualify more entries at this final qualifying competition. Unlike at the World Championships, where countries could qualify more than one spot depending on the placement of the skater, at the Nebelhorn Trophy countries could earn only one spot per discipline, regardless of placement. A total of six spots per singles event, four spots in pairs, and five in ice dance were available at the Nebelhorn Trophy.

If a country declined to use one or more of its qualified spots, the vacated spot was awarded using the results of the Nebelhorn Trophy in descending order of placement.

For the team trophy, scores from the 2012–13 and 2013–14 seasons were tabulated to establish the ten top nations. Each nation compiled a score from their top performers in each of the four disciplines. The Grand Prix Final, taking place in early December 2013, was the final event to affect the Team Trophy score.

Qualification timeline

Qualified countries

Qualification summary

Men's singles

Ladies' singles

Pair skating

 Russian-born Alexandr Zaboev was denied Estonian citizenship, and therefore, cannot compete in the Olympics with partner Natalja Zabijako. Estonia's spot went to Japan.
 Russian-born Daria Popova (partnered with Bruno Massot) did not receive French citizenship in time. France's second spot went to Austria.

Ice dance

Team event

2012–13 total is the sum of the top qualifying point total in each of the four disciplines derived from the 2013 World Figure Skating Championships.If Skaters/Couples of a NOC/ISU Member have not obtained World Standing points in the ISU World Figure Skating Championships 2013, then it is possible to use the 2013 European Figure Skating Championships respectively the 2013 Four Continents Figure Skating Championships and if needed the 2013 World Junior Figure Skating Championships.
2013–14 total is the sum of the top qualifying point total in each of the four disciplines derived from one of the 2013–2014 ISU Grand Prix individual events or Grand Prix Final (senior).If Skaters/Couples of a NOC/ISU Member have not obtained points in the above-mentioned ISU Grand Prix of Figure Skating individual events and Final (senior), then the best result in one event of the 2013–2014 ISU Junior Grand Prix individual events (only in individual events but not the Final) season 2013/14 can be considered.
In each season it is the single best point total used as indicated in Annex A, 2(e) of the ISU qualification system guidelines.
For a nation to be represented in the team event it must have qualified entrants in three of the other four Olympic events.
The full list of  qualifiers is available at the ISU website.

References

Qualification
Qualification for the 2014 Winter Olympics